Aleksandr Nedovyesov and Gonçalo Oliveira were the defending champions but chose not to defend their title.

Yuki Bhambri and Saketh Myneni won the title after defeating Roman Jebavý and Andrej Martin 6–3, 7–5 in the final.

Seeds

Draw

References

External links
 Main draw

UniCredit Czech Open - Doubles
2022 Doubles